Ibrahim Khalef Al-Rabeeah (born 6 September 1954) is a Kuwaiti former sprinter. He competed in the men's 4 × 100 metres relay at the 1976 Summer Olympics.

References

External links
 

1954 births
Living people
Athletes (track and field) at the 1976 Summer Olympics
Kuwaiti male sprinters
Olympic athletes of Kuwait
Place of birth missing (living people)